George Wheler may refer to:
 Sir George Wheler (travel writer) (1651–1724), English clergyman and travel writer
 George Wheler (mill owner) (1836–1908), Canadian mill owner and political figure

See also
Wheler baronets
George Wheeler (disambiguation)